Malkhed railway station is a small railway station located in Amravati District of Maharashtra state in Western India.

Its Indian Railways station code is MLR. It serves Malkhed town in Amravati district and its nearby areas. Currently 6 trains stop at Malkhed railway station

References

Railway stations in Amravati district
Nagpur CR railway division